Samuel Paul Osborne (born 10 January 1999) is an English professional footballer who currently plays for National League North side Buxton. Osborne started his youth career at Dunkirk before moving to Notts County in 2016 where he played for four years, winning two Young Player of the Season awards in a row before moving to Warwickshire side Leamington in 2020.

Football career

Early career 
Osborne joined football club Dunkirk F.C. at the age of six years old playing for their colts. After playing at Dunkirk F.C. for four years, while still at school, Osborne played for Burton Albion F.C. for four and half years before progressing to the senior team of Dunkirk F.C. for the 2015–16 season.

Notts County
Osborne began his professional career with Notts County in 2016 when he signed at the club on a two year scholarship. The winger went on to score numerous goals and win Academy Player of the Year 2016-17. After his success in the Under 18s, Osborne made his professional debut on 7 January 2017 in a 4–1 defeat away at Morecambe. Later that year a brace from the winger saw the Magpies win their Central League Cup group against Osborne's previous club Burton Albion F.C. At the beginning of 2019, the winger hit his sixth goal in six games as he opened the scoring for Notts County Under U23s in their 2-2 draw with Newcastle United F.C. The winger played a prolific role in helping the Notts County U23s to the Central League Cup final and U23s Premier League Cup group stages. After scoring eleven goals in eleven games for the U23s, Osborne was awarded Young Player of the Year 2018-19. At just 19 Osborne had made six senior appearances for the Magpies, when most recently turning out against Newcastle United's Under 21s. His performance in that match, along with his continued development in training, was enough to convince technical director Paul Hart that he was ready to sign pro terms. Osborne scored his first senior goal in September 2019, the "dream goal"  netted the second in a 2-1 win at Boreham Wood away, and his strike was voted Goal of the Month by supporters and  The youngster then made a further 19 appreances for the magies scoring three goals and create seven assists, also helping them to the FA Vase semi final and Vanarama league play off final.

Grantham Town (loan)
During the 2017-18 season, Osborne had a spell at Granthan Town F.C. where he received fifteen appearances, scoring ten and getting 4 assist,Playing a big role within the team, Osborne supported their challenge within the Evo-Stick Premier play off final.

Leamington
Osborne was offered a new contract by Notts County at the end of the 2019/20 season, however he refused this in order to get first team football elsewhere. He moved to Vanarama National League North side Leamington after recommendation from ex-Leamington and current Accrington Stanley forward Colby Bishop, who also came through Notts County's academy. The youngster scored his first Leamington goals in Leamington's unbelievable 4-3 win over Alfreton Town F.C. having come back from a 3-0 half time deficit. The game was mocked up as 'Leamstanbul' by the club's celebratory social media admin. In November, he won the Vanarama National League North Player of the Month award as his side went the month unbeaten. He had a prolific role in helping the "brakes" go unbeaten for one month scoring 9 goals and chipping in with 10 assist.

AFC Fylde
On 9 January 2021, Osborne signed for National League North side AFC Fylde for a substantial undisclosed fee. 

Osborne was awarded the National League North Player of the Month Award for April 2022 with his three goals and three assist through out the month, securing Fylde third place.

Buxton
On 6 October 2022, Osborne signed for fellow National League North club Buxton for an undisclosed fee.

Career statistics

Honours

Individual 

 Notts County Academy Player of the Year : 2016/17
 Notts County Young Player of the Year : 2018/19 
 Notts County Young Player of the Year : 2019/20 
 National League North Player of the Month : November 2020, April 2022

References

External links

1999 births
Living people
English footballers
People from Nottingham
Dunkirk F.C. players
Notts County F.C. players
Basford United F.C. players
Grantham Town F.C. players
Leamington F.C. players
AFC Fylde players
Buxton F.C. players
East Midlands Counties Football League players
English Football League players
Northern Premier League players
National League (English football) players
Association football forwards